Kathleen Weil is a Canadian politician and lawyer. Weil was elected to represent the riding of Notre-Dame-de-Grâce in the National Assembly of Quebec in the 2008 provincial election. She is a member of the Quebec Liberal Party and a former provincial cabinet minister.

Weil studied at McGill University and received a bachelor's degree in history and political sciences in 1978 and a degree in civil and common law in 1982 before being admitted to the Bar of Quebec in 1983. She served as an official with Alliance Quebec.

In addition to her law practice, she was heavily involved from 2000 in the health and social services sector, being an administrative member for the Montreal Children's Hospital and the Régie régionale des services de la santé et des services sociaux à Montréal. Before entering politics, she was President CEO of the Foundation of Greater Montreal.

She was appointed to the Executive Council of Quebec on December 18, 2008, as Minister of Justice and Attorney General.

In 2010, Weil was appointed as Minister of Immigration and Cultural Communities. Following the 2014 provincial election, she was appointed Minister of Immigration, Diversity and Inclusiveness.

On 11 October 2017,  Weil was sworn in as Ministre responsable des Relations avec les Québécois de langue anglaise.

She was re-elected as a member of the Quebec legislative assembly in the 2018 Quebec general election.

Weil is married to Michael Novak, ex-president of SNC-Lavalin International.

Electoral record

* Result compared to Action démocratique

References

External links
 
 Liberal Party biography

Living people
Quebec Liberal Party MNAs
Women MNAs in Quebec
McGill University alumni
McGill University Faculty of Law alumni
Lawyers from Montreal
Justice ministers of Quebec
Anglophone Quebec people
Politicians from Montreal
Canadian women lawyers
21st-century Canadian politicians
21st-century Canadian women politicians
Women government ministers of Canada
Members of the Executive Council of Quebec
Year of birth missing (living people)